Michael Briggs (born 24 July 1966 in Port Elizabeth) is a South African auto racing driver.

Career
He started saloon racing in 1987 with the national Group N Saloon Car Championship, winning the title five times. In 1991 he won the South African GTI Championship. He had great success racing in the South African Touring Car Championship for Opel, where he was crowned champion in 1993 and 1995, and was runner-up in 1994. For the final eight rounds of the British Touring Car Championship he replaced injured driver James Thompson for Vauxhall Sport and finished fifteenth in the championship.

From 1997 to 2002 he competed in the SATCC, the Malaysian Supercar Championship (champion in 2000) and the Asian Touring Car Championship (ATCC). His last season in the ATCC came in 2006 for Team PETRONAS Syntium Proton in a Proton Impian, finishing in third.

Racing record

Complete British Touring Car Championship results
(key) (Races in bold indicate pole position) (Races in italics indicate fastest lap)

References

External links
 PSP Team Profile. 

South African racing drivers
British Touring Car Championship drivers
1966 births
Living people

Asian Touring Car Championship drivers